Belmar is a commuter rail station in the borough of Belmar, Monmouth County, New Jersey, United States on New Jersey Transit's North Jersey Coast Line. The station is not accessible for those with disabilities as part of the Americans With Disabilities Act of 1990.

History 
Belmar station opened as part of an extension from Asbury Park–Ocean Grove station of the New York and Long Branch Railroad on September 14, 1875, as Ocean Beach station. The name of the station was changed to Belmar when the municipality changed its name from Ocean Beach to Elcho to Belmar in a month's span in 1889.

Station layout
The station has two low-level brick cobblestone side platforms.

References

External links

 Station from 8th Avenue from Google Maps Street View

Railway stations in Monmouth County, New Jersey
NJ Transit Rail Operations stations
Stations on the North Jersey Coast Line
Belmar, New Jersey
Former New York and Long Branch Railroad stations
Railway stations in the United States opened in 1875
1875 establishments in New Jersey